1994 Emperor's Cup Final was the 74th final of the Emperor's Cup competition. The final was played at National Stadium in Tokyo on January 1, 1995. Bellmare Hiratsuka won the championship.

Overview
Bellmare Hiratsuka won their 3rd title, by defeating Cerezo Osaka 2–0 with Koji Noguchi 2 goals.

Match details

See also
1994 Emperor's Cup

References

Emperor's Cup
1994 in Japanese football
Shonan Bellmare matches
Cerezo Osaka matches